Christine Sutton is a particle physicist who edited the CERN Courier from 2003 to 2015. She retired from CERN in 2015.

Sutton was previously based at the University of Oxford, working in the Particle Physics Group and tutoring physics at St Catherine's College.

She was Physical Sciences Editor for New Scientist magazine in the early 1980s, and has authored several non-fiction science books, most recently (with Frank Close and Michael Marten) The Particle Odyssey (1987, 2002).

Contributions to Encyclopædia Britannica 
She also contributed to the 2007 Encyclopædia Britannica, with 24 articles on particle physics:

 Argonne National Laboratory (Micropædia article)
 Colliding-Beam Storage Ring (Micropædia article)
 DESY (Micropædia article)
 Electroweak theory (Micropædia article)
 Fermi National Accelerator Laboratory (Micropædia article)
 Feynman diagram (Micropædia article)
 Flavour (Micropædia article)
 Gluon (Micropædia article)
 Higgs particle (Micropædia article)
 Linear accelerator (Micropædia article)
 Particle accelerators (in part, Macropædia article)
 Quantum chromodynamics (Micropædia article)
 Renormalization (Micropædia article)
 SLAC (Micropædia article)
 Standard model (Micropædia article)
 Strong nuclear force (Micropædia article)
 Subatomic particles (Macropædia article)
 Supergravity (Micropædia article)
 Superstring theory (Micropædia article)
 Supersymmetry (Micropædia article)
 Tau (Micropædia article)
 Unified field theory (Micropædia article)
 Weak nuclear force (Micropædia article)
 Z particle (Micropædia article)

References

Contributors to the Encyclopædia Britannica
British physicists
Particle physicists
Living people
People associated with CERN
Year of birth missing (living people)